Caleb Wein (born April 19, 2001) is an American ice dancer. With his skating partner, Angela Ling, he is the 2022 JGP Russia bronze medalist, the 2022 U.S. junior national silver medalist, and finished seventh at the 2022 World Junior Figure Skating Championships.

Personal life 
Wein was born on April 19, 2001, in Rockville, Maryland, United States. As of 2022, he is a student at the University of Maryland, where he is an aerospace engineering major.

Career

Early years 
Wein began learning to skate at age four through a local park and recreation program. He began training in ice dance at age six when he joined the Wheaton Ice Skating Academy, run by his former coaches Alexei Kiliakov and Elena Novak. He competed with his first partner, Emma Gunter, for six years before Gunter chose to retire after the 2018–19 season. Wein connected with his current partner, Angela Ling, through Ice Partner Search.

Programs

With Ling

With Gunter

Competitive highlights 
CS: Challenger Series; JGP: Junior Grand Prix

With Ling

With Gunter

With Gourianova

References

External links 
 

2001 births
Living people
American male ice dancers
People from Rockville, Maryland
Competitors at the 2023 Winter World University Games